The 1973 Formula One season was the 27th season of FIA Formula One motor racing. It featured the 1973 World Championship of Drivers and the 1973 International Cup for F1 Manufacturers, which were contested concurrently over a fifteen-race series that commenced on 28 January and ended on 7 October. There were two new races for the 1973 season – the Brazilian Grand Prix at Interlagos in São Paulo and the Swedish Grand Prix at Anderstorp. The season also included two non-championship races which were open to both Formula One and Formula 5000 cars.

The World Championship of Drivers was won by Jackie Stewart, driving for Elf Team Tyrrell, and the International Cup for F1 Manufacturers by John Player Team Lotus. In the World Championship, Lotus teammates Emerson Fittipaldi and Ronnie Peterson raced each other while Stewart was supported at Tyrrell by François Cevert. Stewart took the Drivers' title at the Italian Grand Prix at Monza, but then at the final race of the season, the United States Grand Prix at Watkins Glen, Cevert crashed during Saturday practice in the notorious 'Esses' and was killed instantly. Stewart and Tyrrell withdrew from the race, handing the Manufacturers' title to Lotus. At the end of the season Stewart made public his decision to retire, a decision that had been made before the US Grand Prix. By the end of the 1973 season the best car on the track was probably the new McLaren M23, a wedge-shaped car following the same concept as the Lotus 72 but with more conventional suspension and up-to-date aerodynamics. The 1973 season marked the debut of future world champion James Hunt at the Monaco Grand Prix driving a privateer March 731 entered by Hesketh Racing.

The 1973 season saw the intervention of a Safety Car in Formula One for the first time, in the form of a Porsche 914 at the Canadian Grand Prix. As well as Cevert, Briton Roger Williamson was also killed during the season, in a crash at the Dutch Grand Prix at Zandvoort.

Another change to the rules introduced this season was the cars doing a full warm-up lap before the race. Prior to this, tracks included a dummy grid a short distance behind a grid proper, and the cars would simply move from one to the other to begin the race.

It was also this season that the numbering system for teams was formalised. In the second race of the season, the Brazilian Grand Prix, team-mates were paired - Lotus drivers 1 and 2; Tyrrell's 3 and 4 and so on - though the numbers assigned to each team still changed for a couple of races until the fifth race, the Belgian Grand Prix, at which the order was set for the rest of the season. For the 1974 season, the numbers were assigned based on finishing positions in the 1973 constructor's championship, after which teams did not change numbers unless they won the drivers' championship (or signed the current world champion), or if a team dropped out.

Drivers and constructors 
The following teams and drivers contested the 1973 World Championship.

Calendar

Calendar changes 
The Spanish Grand Prix was moved from Jarama near Madrid to the Montjuïc street circuit in Barcelona, in keeping with the event-sharing arrangement between the two circuits.

The Brazilian Grand Prix hosted its first World Championship Grand Prix in 1973. The race was held at Autodromo de Interlagos on 11 February.

The Belgian Grand Prix and Monaco Grand Prix swapped places on the calendar so that the Monaco round follows the Belgian Grand Prix.

The Belgian Grand Prix was moved from Nivelles-Baulers to Circuit Zolder, in keeping with the event-sharing arrangement between the two circuits. It also carried the title of European Grand Prix for 1973.

The Swedish Grand Prix hosted its first World Championship Grand Prix in 1973. The race was held at Scandinavian Raceway on 17 June.

The French Grand Prix was moved from Charade Circuit to Paul Ricard Circuit.

The British Grand Prix was moved from Brands Hatch to Silverstone, in keeping with the event-sharing arrangement between the two circuits.

The Dutch Grand Prix returned to the calendar in 1973, it was cancelled in 1972 due to safety upgrades that were not completed at the Zandvoort Circuit in time for the 1972 race. The upgrade were ready including new asphalt, new barriers, a change in the circuit's layout and a new race control tower for the race on 29 July.

Results and standings

Grands Prix 
The following races counted towards both the 1973 World Championship of Drivers and the 1973 International Cup for F1 Manufacturers.

World Drivers' Championship standings

Points were awarded on a 9–6–4–3–2–1 basis to the first six finishers in each race. For classification, only the seven best results from the first eight races and the six best results from the last seven races were retained. Drivers who scored an equal number of points were awarded equal championship classifications, regardless of the relative number of wins, second places, etc. scored by each driver. The FIA did not award a championship classification to those drivers who did not score points in the championship.

† Cevert suffered a fatal accident in qualifying for the United States Grand Prix.

International Cup for F1 Manufacturers standings
Points were awarded on a 9–6–4–3–2–1 basis to the first six finishers in each race. Points were only awarded for the position filled by the best placed car from each manufacturer. For classification, only the seven best results from the first eight races and the six best results from the last seven races were retained, Points in the table outside of the parentheses are the points which contributed to the championship, points within parentheses show the total points scored.

Ensign, which did not score points during the championship, was not given a classification in the official FIA results.

Non-championship races
The 1973 Formula One season included two non-championship races which were open to both Formula One and Formula 5000 cars.

References

Formula One seasons